The 1985–86 Missouri Tigers men's basketball team represented the University of Missouri as a member of the Big Eight Conference during the 1985–86 NCAA men's basketball season. Led by head coach Norm Stewart, the Tigers finished 4th in the Big Eight regular season standings and received an at-large bid to the NCAA tournament as No. 11 seed in the West region. The Tigers were beaten by No. 6 seed UAB, 66–64, in the opening round and finished with an overall record of 21–14 (8–6 Big Eight).

Roster

Schedule and results

 
|-
!colspan=9 style=| Non-Conference Regular Season

|-
!colspan=9 style=| Big Eight Regular Season

|-
!colspan=9 style=| Big Eight Conference tournament

|-
!colspan=9 style=| NCAA tournament

Rankings

References

Missouri
Missouri
Missouri Tigers men's basketball seasons